IV Play is the fifth album by American recording artist The-Dream. The album was released on May 28, 2013, by Radio Killa Records and Def Jam Recordings. It features guest appearances from Jay-Z, Big Sean, Beyoncé,    Pusha T,  2 Chainz, Kelly Rowland, Gary Clark Jr. and Fabolous. IV Play is an R&B album with overtly sexual themes.

Background
Prior to the release of his 2010 album Love King, The-Dream announced in interviews that it would be his final solo album. When the album was released, the song "Sex Intelligent (Remix)" featured a line in which the artist sang that he would release another album, titled Love Affair, on June 7, 2011. However, multiple delays pushed back the album's release for nearly two years and several different album titles were reported.

On the album's original release date, June 7, 2011, he released a promotional single free on the Internet, a medley of two new tracks titled "Body Work / Fuck My Brains Out." On August 31, he released the album 1977 for free online. The album was later retitled Terius Nash: 1977 and released commercially with a modified track list by Def Jam Recordings on December 18, 2012.

While backstage at the 2013 Grammy Awards, The-Dream revealed the final title to Billboard. In an interview on 106 & Park on April 2, 2013, The-Dream announced that Beyoncé, Kelly Rowland, Big Sean, and Jay-Z would appear on the album. On May 13, 2013 the track listing was revealed, including guest appearances by Pusha T, Gary Clark Jr. and 2 Chainz.

Marketing and sales
In June 2011, The-Dream released a double promotional single titled "Body Work / Fuck My Brains Out." In 2012, he released "Roc" (initially reported to be the album's lead single, although the first single that appeared on the final version of the album was "Slow It Down", released as a digital download on March 5, 2013. On April 2, the official music video was released. The album's title track was released as the second single on April 9, and its music video was released on May 16. A music video for "Too Early", featuring Gary Clark Jr., was released on August 16. On May 15, the third single "High Art" was released.

In support of the album, he co-headlined the "Lights Out" tour with Kelly Rowland, though most of the tour dates were canceled after Rowland was hired as a judge on The X Factor. On May 20, 2013, The-Dream performed the song "Where Have You Been" with Rowland on The Tonight Show with Jay Leno. The following day, the album became available for streaming via The-Dream's VEVO channel.

IV Play sold 23,000 copies in its first week of release, debuting at number 16 on the Billboard 200 chart on June 5, 2013. By the end of the month, it had sold 42,000 in the US. In June 2015, it reached 68,000 copies sold there.

Critical reception

IV Play was met with a lukewarm response from critics. According to Treble journalist Connor Brown, it was "without a doubt the worst reception that any of The-Dream’s records have received". At Metacritic, which assigns a weighted mean rating out of 100 to reviews from professional critics, the album received an average score of 62 — indicating "generally favorable reviews"  based on 19 reviews.

Reviewing in May 2013, Spin magazine's Jordan Sargent said IV Play is "a very good album" and also one that lacks the level of experimentation featured on The-Dream's previous records, observing "too many songs here propped up on one simplistic notion". Jesse Cataldo of Slant Magazine applauded the second half of songs as "densely layered, immaculately produced, and frequently luminous", although he found the guest-heavy first half to be uneven. Pitchfork reviewer Andrew Ryce also criticized the "string of clunkers" early in the album, but felt that its highlights show that "the brilliant auteur we fell in love with is still in here somewhere." Alex Macpherson of The Guardian was more critical, saying it lacks the "panache" and "commitment" of The-Dream's past work while calling him "a grotesquely diminished figure promising bad sex in return for retreads of old ideas". AllMusic's Andy Kellman found the plentiful guest appearances "trivial", as well as the album itself.

Track listing

Personnel 
Credits for IV Play are adapted from Allmusic.

 2 Chainz – featured artist 
 Kory Aaron – assistant engineer 
 Eric Altenburger – art producer, photo production 
 Zack Atkinson – art producer, photo production 
 Chris Atlas – marketing 
 Alton Bates – vocal engineer 
 Beyoncé – featured artist 
 Big Sean – featured artist 
 Bernice Burgos – hair stylist, make-up 
 Gary Clark, Jr. – featured artist 
 Rob Cohen – assistant engineer 
 Carol Corless – package production 
 Da Internz – producer 
 Los DaMystro – producer 
 Demacio "Demo" Castellon – engineer 
 The-Dream – creative director, executive producer, piano, producer, vocals
 Fabolous – featured artist 
 Glass John – programming 
 Trehy Harris – mixing assistant 
 Hit-Boy – drum programming 
 Sam Holland – assistant engineer 
 Jaycen Joshua – mixing 
 Jay-Z – featured artist 
 Marcus Johnson – assistant engineer 
 Terese Joseph – A&R 

 Sean Kryston – set design 
 Dave Kutch – mastering 
 Karen Kwak – A&R 
 Jason Patterson – assistant engineer 
 Sara Pickett – hair stylist, make-up 
 Chaka Pilgrim – executive producer 
 Pusha T – featured artist 
 Ramon Rivas – assistant engineer 
 Jesus Rodriguez – assistant engineer 
 Dave Rowland – assistant engineer 
 Kelly Rowland – featured artist 
 Todd Russell – art direction, creative director, design 
 Lenny S. – A&R 
 Bart Schoudel – additional production, bass, engineer, vocal producer 
 Miykal Snoddy – producer 
 Rob Suchecki – assistant engineer 
 Brian "B-Luv" Thomas – engineer 
 Pat Thrall – engineer, production engineer 
 Meredith Truax – art producer, photo production 
 Finis "KY" White – vocal engineer, vocal mixing 
 Stuart White – vocal engineer 
 Eric Wong – marketing 
 Kristen Yiengst – art direction 
 Andrew Zeah – photography 
 Joe Zeff – illustrations

Charts

Weekly charts

Year-end charts

Release history

References

2013 albums
The-Dream albums
Albums produced by Da Internz
Albums produced by The-Dream
Def Jam Recordings albums